Hao Ying (born 1958) is a professor of electrical and computer engineering at Wayne State University in Detroit, Michigan. He was named a Fellow of the Institute of Electrical and Electronics Engineers (IEEE) in 2012 for his contributions to the theory and biomedical applications of fuzzy control.

Works

References 

1958 births
Living people
American biomedical engineers
Donghua University alumni
University of Alabama at Birmingham alumni
Fellow Members of the IEEE
Wayne State University faculty